Dead Awake is a 2016 American supernatural psychological horror film written by Jeffrey Reddick and directed by Phillip Guzman. It stars Jocelin Donahue, Jesse Bradford, Jesse Borrego, Brea Grant, James Eckhouse, and Lori Petty.

Plot 
Kate Bowman is a by-the-books social worker who is investigating a series of deaths after her twin sister, Beth, suddenly dies under mysterious circumstances. Each victim suffered from sleep paralysis, a frightening ailment that immobilizes its victims as they dream. Kate is approached by an unorthodox doctor who warns of an evil entity that haunts people in their sleep. She brushes aside his admonition, but when a terrifying entity begins to haunt Kate's friends and loved ones, she must fight to stay awake to stop the nightmare.

After becoming convinced the monster is real, Kate teams up with Beth's boyfriend Evan, and meets up with the doctor again. They come up with a plan to allow her to fall asleep and inject her with adrenaline before the creature can kill her. She falls asleep and all seems to be going well, until the monster attacks and she shows no signs of being in sleep paralysis (her eyes are closed, and she seems to be sleeping peacefully). Evan notices something amiss, and figures out that she's in paralysis and under attack.  They manage to administer the adrenaline just in time to wake her, apparently dispersing the creature and freeing Kate from its attacks.

As they prep to perform the same procedure on Evan, Kate suddenly realizes that her parents have the research on the phenomenon and could be under attack as well. They arrive at her parents' house, and find them doing just fine, after which, they head to Evan's apartment so Kate can shower and he can feed his kitten. While Kate is showering, Evan falls asleep, and the 'hag' monster emerges from a painting of it he created earlier in the film. As the monster attacks, Kate comes out of the shower and tries to revive him, unsuccessfully. Paramedics arrive on the scene, and he is seen being taken away while Kate looks on, despondent.

Kate visits him in the hospital to find out he's in a coma.  The doctor arrives, and convinces Kate that she hasn't defeated the monster yet, and that she needs to go to sleep and break the sleep paralysis on her own in order to defeat it once and for all.

After seeing Kate to sleep, the doctor watches over her and sees her attacked by the monster but can't get his adrenaline pump to work.  He goes to sleep as well, knowing the monster will come after him over Kate.  Once he falls asleep, Kate is temporarily left alone and has a dream-within-a-dream sequence where she meets her sister. Her sister, Beth, begins to prey on her fears of being a bad sister, and the reason she's dead. Kate realizes Beth would not be saying the things she's saying, and attacks Beth, knowing it's really the Hag.  She stabs the hag, then finds herself back in her 'real' body being choked by the Hag.  She breaks her paralysis, and attacks the hag, strangling it (apparently) to death.

In the next scene, Kate is vlogging about her experiences and telling her audience that Evan has awoken, and her paralysis has come back, but that the Hag has not reappeared.  She also promises her audience that she will not stop until she comes up with a permanent solution for everyone.

In the final scene, Dr. Sykes is seen asleep and wakes up to see the hag appearing over the end of her bed and proceeds to attack her, with the screen fading to black.

Cast 

 Jocelin Donahue as Beth/Kate Bowman
 Jesse Bradford as Evan
 Jesse Borrego as Dr. Hassan Davies
 Lori Petty as Dr. Sykes
 James Eckhouse as Mr. Bowman
 Mona Lee Fultz as Mrs. Bowman
 Brea Grant as Linda Noble
 AJ Gutierrez as Darryl Noble
 Billy Blair as Mr. Pang
 Liz Mikel as Nurse
 Jeffrey Reddick as Anthony
 Natali Jones as The Night Hag

Release 
The film premiered at Shriekfest on October 8, 2016.

Reception
Dead Awake received negative reviews from critics. Review aggregation website Rotten Tomatoes gives the film an approval rating of 13%, based on 8 reviews, with no critics' consensus listed. On Metacritic, the film has no aggregate score, but the three reviews listed are unanimously negative. IMDB shows an average rating of 4.6 out of 10 with more than 2400 ratings.

References

External links 
 
 
  
 

2016 films
2016 independent films
American supernatural horror films
American independent films
American teen horror films
2010s English-language films
2010s monster movies
2010s psychological horror films
Films about sleep disorders
2010s teen films
2010s supernatural horror films
2010s American films